Siloe is a community council located in the Mohale's Hoek District of Lesotho. Its population in 2006 was 18,261.

Villages
The community of Siloe includes the villages of Fifteen Miles (Khateane) Ha 'Malintja, Ha Chabeli, Ha Hamo, Ha HlapaneHa Kamela, Ha Kekeleng, Ha Khamolane, Ha Khorola, Ha Koloti, Ha Lebele, Ha Loui, Ha Mahlatsi, Ha Mahlehle, Ha Mahoete, Ha Majoale, Ha Maleka, Ha Maseli, Ha Masunhloane, Ha Matoko, Ha Matsie, Ha Matsipa, Ha Moeketsi, Ha Mohapeloa, Ha Mohohlo, Ha Mokhati, Ha Mokhothu, Ha Moko, Ha Mokoroane, Ha Mokotane, Ha Molatoli, Ha Moletsane, Ha Montšo, Ha Monyake, Ha Mpopo, Ha Ntilane, Ha Pii, Ha Pitsi, Ha Popolosi, Ha Raboko, Ha Raboko (Sefateng), Ha Rajane, Ha Rakulubane, Ha Rakulubane (Matebeleng), Ha Raleaooa, Ha Ralikhalile, Ha Ramabele,Taung Ha Ramathe, Ha Ramokausu, Ha Ramokhele, Ha Ramonate, Ha Ramootsi, Ha Ramotsoanyane, Ha Rantsie, Ha Raphuthing, Ha Raselepe, Ha Rathamae, Ha Raubi, Ha Salemone, Ha Seabo, Ha Sephapo, Ha Serabele, Ha Thulo, Ha Tiheli, Ha Tsienyane, Khateane, Khuthumala (Letlapeng), Lefikeng (Ha Mokhele), Lehloaneng, Lekhalong, Leribe, Letsatseng, Linareng, Liphookoaneng, Lithotseleng, Majakaneng, Malimong, Maralleng (Ha Tjama), Matšoareng, Moreneng, Mosehlane, Motse-Mocha, Ntširele, Pontšeng, Qalike, Salang, Sekhutloaneng, Setasi, Siloe (Ha Thulo), Sokase, Takalatsa, Thabaneng (Ha Pii), Thabeng, Theella, Thotaneng, Thoteng, Tlokotsing (Ha Mokhethi), Tlokotsing (Moreneng), Tlokotsing (Thabaneng) and Tsoloane.

References

External links
 Google map of community villages

Populated places in Mohale's Hoek District